<< List of Vanity Fair caricatures (1868–1869) >> List of Vanity Fair caricatures (1875–1879)

The following is from a list of caricatures  published 1870–1874 by the British magazine Vanity Fair (1868–1914).

Next List of Vanity Fair (British magazine) caricatures (1875–1879)

 
1870s in the United Kingdom